Ildar Nugumanov (born 5 May 1988) is a Russian futsal player who plays for Tyumen and the Russian national futsal team.

References

External links
UEFA profile
AMFR profile

1988 births
Living people
Russian men's futsal players